| top point scorer =  Emma Sing (Gloucester-Hartpury) (150 points)
| top try scorer =  Marlie Packer (Saracens) (17 tries)
| website    = www.premier15s.com
| prevseason = 2020–21
| nextseason = 2022–23
}}

The 2021–22 Premier 15s is the 5th season of the Premier 15s (23rd including editions of the previous Women's Premiership), of the top flight of English domestic women's rugby union competition and the second to be sponsored by Allianz. Incorporated in the season also was the inaugural Allianz Cup, a women's equivalent of the Premiership Rugby Cup.

Saracens Women, who finished top of the league table during the regular season, won their third Premiers 15s title on 3 June 2022, after defeating Exeter Chiefs Women by 43–21 in the play-off final.

Teams 
These are the 10 teams competing in the 2021–22 season:

Premier 15s

Table

Regular season
Fixtures for the season were announced by the Rugby Football Union on 6 August 2021.

Round 1

Round 2

Round 3

Round 4

Round 5

Round 6

Round 7

Round 8

Round 9

Round 10

Round 11

Round 12

Round 13

Round 14

Round 15

Round 16

Round 17

Round 18

Play-offs

Semi-finals

Final

Leading scorers

Most points

Most tries

Team of the Season 
The 2021–22 Allianz Premier 15s Team of the Season, which was revealed on 29 June, features players from seven different clubs and three different nationalities. The team was selected by a panel of five media experts – Jessica Hayden, Nick Heath, Katherine Merchant, Sara Orchard and Fiona Thomas.

Allianz Cup

The Allianz Cup saw the Premier 15s clubs ranked by their previous finishing position and drawn in two pools of five, with clubs playing each other once in two home games, two away games, one bye week over five rounds.

The top two teams in each pool will progress to the semi-finals played at the highest ranked clubs’ venues (16 April 2022) as well a third-placed play-off and final (both 22 April 2022). The Allianz Cup final will be played at the home venue of the winning semi-finalist club with the highest points’ difference.

The bottom four ranked teams will enter fifth, seventh and ninth placed play-off finals with the home team once again determined by stage one league tables. The Cup competition also gives greater exposure to every Allianz Premier 15s round.

Cup pool stage

Pool 1

Round 1

Round 2

Round 3

Round 4

Round 5

Pool 2

Round 1

Round 2

Round 3

Round 4

Round 5

References 

Premier 15s